Sparrowhawk Brook is a creek that flows into Schenevus Creek in Schenevus, New York.

References

Rivers of New York (state)
Rivers of Otsego County, New York